Ramal de São Roque was a Portuguese branch line which connected the station of Aveiro, on the Linha do Norte, to the Canal de São Roque.

See also 
 List of railway lines in Portugal
 History of rail transport in Portugal

References

Sources

 

Railway lines in Portugal
Iberian gauge railways